Events from the year 1695 in China.

Incumbents 
 Kangxi Emperor (34rd year)

Events 
 A moonloft on the Huaisheng Mosque in Guangzhou was built
 2nd Month: the reconstruction of the Hall of Supreme Harmony begins
 5th Month: further tours are made in the outskirts of the capital. New dams and inlets at seaports are inspected. The Temple of the Sea God (Haishen miao) is constructed.
 6th Month: Lady Si is named the consort of Heir Apparent Yunreng.
 11th Month: the emperor conducts a grand military inspection at the South Gardens (Nan yuan). Orders are issued for codifying the use of horns and drums in military inspections.

References

 
 .

 
China